Monaco competed at the 2016 Winter Youth Olympics in Lillehammer, Norway from 12 to 21 February 2016.

Prince Albert of Monaco attended Day 2 of the olympic games, Saturday 13 February, to support Monaco's one athlete.

Alpine skiing

Boys

See also
Monaco at the 2016 Summer Olympics

References

Nations at the 2016 Winter Youth Olympics
Monaco at the Youth Olympics
2016 in Monégasque sport